Barry Singh is the artistic director and conductor of the Northern Rivers Symphony Orchestra.

His journey from a banana plantation in the Murwillumbah Hinterland to the Queensland Conservatorium and to the establishment of the premier orchestra for the Gold Coast and Northern Rivers has been featured on Australian Story on ABC Television.

In 2001, Singh was awarded the prestigious Individual Regional TOAN (The Orchestras of Australia Network) award for fostering excellence in an orchestra in a regional area.

References 

Living people
1959 births
Australian conductors (music)
Australian people of Indian descent
Australian violinists
Male violinists
People from the Northern Rivers
Queensland Conservatorium Griffith University alumni
21st-century conductors (music)
21st-century violinists
21st-century Australian male musicians
21st-century Australian musicians